Kosmos 2155 ( meaning Cosmos 2155) is a Russian US-KS missile early warning satellite which was launched in 1991 as part of the Russian Space Forces' Oko programme. The satellite is designed to identify missile launches using optical telescopes and infrared sensors.

Kosmos 2155 was launched from Site 81/23 at Baikonur Cosmodrome in Kazakhstan. A Proton-K carrier rocket with a DM-2 upper stage was used to perform the launch, which took place at 17:51 UTC on 13 September 1991. The launch successfully placed the satellite into geostationary orbit. It subsequently received its Kosmos designation, and the international designator 1991-064A. The United States Space Command assigned it the Satellite Catalog Number 21702.

It was operational for about 9 months.

See also

List of Kosmos satellites (2001–2250)

References

Spacecraft launched in 1991
Spacecraft launched by Proton rockets
Kosmos satellites
Oko
1991 in the Soviet Union